Cimochy  (from 1929–1945 Reuß) is a village in the administrative district of Gmina Wieliczki, within Olecko County, Warmian-Masurian Voivodeship, in northern Poland. 

The village has a population of 456.

Notable residents
 Arno von Lenski (1893–1986), general

References

Cimochy